The Norwegian STOLport network (in Norwegian kortbanenettet i Noreg (Nynorsk) or kortbanenettet i Norge (Bokmål)) is a network of STOLports, meaning that they are airports with short runways. The standard length of these runways is 800 m, compared to around 2500 m for a normal airport with 6-seat wide jetliners. In addition to shorter length, these airports are also narrower, with a standard width of 30 m compared to that of 60 m, respectively. They can only be used with small propeller aircraft. As of 2020, 26 of these airports are in use and 4 have been closed.

The Norwegian STOLport network is a result of political decisions in the 1960s and start of the 1970s. The goal was to meet the requirement for better  infrastructure out in the countryside, where there was a great desire for the establishment of airports. The network was officially opened 30 June 1968 by minister of transport Håkon Kyllingmark together with mayors, county governors and representatives of the airlines. Together they flew the route Trondheim–Namsos–Brønnøysund–Sandnessjøen–Mo i Rana–Bodø, with ribbon-cutting opening ceremonies at each stop. Most of the airports were subsequently built in the period 1968–1975.

Background 
The ministry of transport with Håkon Kyllingmark from the Conservative Party was a promoter for the work of developing new airports, especially in the northernmost counties of Norway. By the start of the 1970s, oil revenues had not yet taken hold in the Norwegian economy, so it was important to keep costs down. The result of this work was a standard for short airports, where the runway, approach equipment, terminal buildings, et cetera, was standardized and simple.

In Sweden, a network of regional 1500 meter long runways was built during the same time.

Remote control towers 
On 20 October 2020, Avinor opened a remote control tower situated in Bodø as a cost effective solution intended for STOLports in Norway with little traffic. The remote tower technology is planned to be rolled out to a total of 15 airports in Norway by the end of 2022.

Airplanes 
The largest airplanes utilizing the Norwegian STOLport network today are Bombardier DHC-8 Dash-8 and ATR 42. During the first years, airlines such as Widerøe mostly used the DHC-6 Twin Otter with 13 seats.

Future 
Avinor, the Norwegian airport authority worries about the future availability of aircraft for  runway, in future when older aircraft currently used retires. Currently, DHC-8-100 aircraft, manufactured in the early 1990s, are used. Avinor has found that after 2010, no new aircraft can be bought which has more than 20 seats and is able to use such short runways. To extend them to above  requires wider runway and greater space between the runway and buildings. This means a much higher cost, probably totally new runway, or new airport buildings. The least used will not be extended, but will have to be flown with very small aircraft. In 2022 ATR will launch a modification of its 48-seat ATR 42 which will be able to use 800 meter runways. In the national plan for transportation 2022–2033 is however only Mo i Rana selected for a major project, a new airport.

List of current STOLports in Norway 
The following is a list of the 26 STOLports in Norway which are currently in use per 2020:

Sources for runway length can be found in the respective articles.

Closed STOLports in Norway 
The following four STOLports have been closed:

 Førde airport, Øyrane (closed 1986) – replaced by a new STOLport
 Værøy airport (closed 1990) – replaced by a new heliport
 Båtsfjord Airport, Båtsfjorddalen, (closed 1999) – replaced by a new STOLport
 Narvik airport, Framnes (closed 2017) – road shortcut built to a larger airport

References 

Airports in Norway
Aviation in Norway